The 2014 Wake Forest Demon Deacons football team represented Wake Forest University during the 2014 NCAA Division I FBS football season.  The team was coached by Dave Clawson, who was coaching his first season at the school, and play its home games at BB&T Field.  Wake Forest competed in the Atlantic Coast Conference as part of the Atlantic Division, as they have since the league's inception in 1953. They finished the season 3–9, 1–7 in ACC play to finish in a tie for sixth place in the Atlantic Division.

Recruiting

Schedule

Roster

Coaching staff

Game summaries

Louisiana-Monroe
2nd meeting. 0–1 all time. Last meeting 2013, 21-19 Warhawks in Winston-Salem.

Gardner-Webb
2nd meeting. 1–0 all time. Last meeting 2011, 48-5 Deacons in Winston-Salem.

Utah State
1st meeting.

Army
14th meeting. 9–4 all time. Last meeting 2013, 25-11 Deacons in West Point.

Louisville
2nd meeting. 0–1 all time. Last meeting 2007 Orange Bowl, 24-13 Cardinals in Miami Gardens.

Florida State
33rd meeting. 6–25–1 all time. Last meeting 2013, 59-3 Seminoles in Winston-Salem.

Syracuse
4th meeting. 1–2 all time. Last meeting 2013, 13-0 Orange in Syracuse.

Boston College
22nd meeting. 8–11–2 all time. Last meeting 2013, 24-10 Eagles in Chestnut Hill.

Clemson
80th meeting. 17–61–1 all time. Last meeting 2013, 56-7 Tigers in Clemson.

NC State
108th meeting. 38–63–6 all time. Last meeting 2013, 28-13 Deacons in Winston-Salem.

Virginia Tech
37th meeting. 11–24–1 all time. Last meeting 2011, 38-17 Hokies in Winston-Salem.

Duke
95th meeting. 37–55–2 all time. Last meeting 2013, 28-21 Blue Devils in Winston-Salem.

Statistics

Scores by quarter

Offense

Rushing

Passing

Receiving

Scoring

2015 NFL draftees

References

Wake Forest
Wake Forest Demon Deacons football seasons
Wake Forest Demon Deacons football